Changhong Township is a township under the administration of Kaihua County, Zhejiang, China. , it has ten villages under its administration:
Beiyuan Village
Fangcun Village
Tiankeng Village
Taoyuan Village
Hongqiao Village
Xinghe Village
Shilichuan Village
Xiachuan Village
Zhenzikeng Village
Kukeng Village

References 

Township-level divisions of Zhejiang
Kaihua County